Mitromorpha pylei is a species of sea snail, a marine gastropod mollusk in the family Mitromorphidae.

Description
The length of the shell attains 3.6 mm.

Distribution
This marine species occurs off the Vanuatu.

References

Description of four new shallow water Mitromorpha species from the western Pacific (Gastropoda: Mitromorphidae). Visaya 4(2):: 21–27

External links
 MNHN, Paris: Mitromorpha pylei (holotype)
 

pylei
Gastropods described in 2014